Ad Hermes  (27 August 1929, in Breda – 31 January 2002, in Veghel) was a Dutch politician.

See also
List of Dutch politicians

1929 births
2002 deaths
Catholic People's Party politicians
20th-century Dutch politicians
Christian Democratic Appeal politicians
Members of the House of Representatives (Netherlands)
State Secretaries for Education of the Netherlands
People from Breda